Pierre Botayi Bomato (born 11 March 1993) is a Congolese football striker who plays for Panthère du Ndé.

References

External links

1993 births
Living people
Footballers from Kinshasa
Democratic Republic of the Congo footballers
Democratic Republic of the Congo youth international footballers
Democratic Republic of the Congo international footballers
Association football forwards
Democratic Republic of the Congo expatriate footballers
Expatriate footballers in Angola
Democratic Republic of the Congo expatriate sportspeople in Angola
AS Vita Club players
FC MK Etanchéité players
Progresso Associação do Sambizanga players
Progresso da Lunda Sul players
FC Saint-Éloi Lupopo players
AS Maniema Union players